Anthony or Tony Henry is the name of:

Anthony Henry (American football), cornerback
Anthony Henry (athlete) (born 1967), Antigua and Barbuda Olympic sprinter
Tony Henry (footballer, born 1957), retired English midfielder who played for Bolton Wanderers, Manchester City, Oldham Athletic, Shrewsbury Town and Stoke City
Tony Henry (footballer, born 1979), retired English defender who played for West Ham United and Lincoln City
Tony Henry (singer), English opera singer
Tony Henry (drummer), Australian drummer of The Cockroaches
 Anthony Henry (printer), Canadian printer and publisher
 Anthony Henry (wrestler), American professional wrestler

See also

Henry Anthony (disambiguation)